Si Jalak Harupat Stadium is a multi-purpose stadium located in Kutawaringin Subdistrict, Bandung Regency, West Java, Indonesia. It is currently used for association football matches and was used for the 2018 Asian Games men's football tournament.

The stadium is the home ground of Persikab Kabupaten Bandung. Since 2009, Persib Bandung started playing home matches here. The stadium holds 30,100 people.

Sporting events 

 2008 AFF Suzuki Cup Group A match between Myanmar vs Cambodia
 2013 Piala Menpora
 2018 Asian Games men's football tournament
 2023 FIFA U-20 World Cup

International matches hosted

Tournament results

2008 AFF Championship

2018 Asian Games Men's Football

See also
 List of stadiums in Indonesia
 List of stadiums by capacity

References

See also
 List of stadiums in Indonesia

Bandung Regency
Sports venues in Indonesia
Sport in West Java
Football venues in Indonesia
Athletics (track and field) venues in Indonesia
Multi-purpose stadiums in Indonesia
Sports venues in West Java
Multi-purpose stadiums in West Java
Football venues in West Java
Athletics (track and field) venues in West Java
Buildings and structures in West Java
Sports venues completed in 2003
Venues of the 2018 Asian Games
Asian Games football venues